Agrani Bank Shishu Academy Children's Literature Award is a prize for writers working on children's literature, which is provided by the Bangladesh Shishu Academy. In 1981, Agrani Bank and Children's Literature Award was instituted. It was named 'Agrani Bank-Shishu Sahitya Puraskar' since 2007.

History 
Agrani Bank-Shishu Academy Child literature award was instituted in 1981. From 2007 it was named 'Agrani Bank-Shishu Sahitya Puraskar'. Since 2008 it has been named 'Agrani Bank-Shishu Academy Child Literature Award'. This award was organized based on the book published in the Bengali year. Each year seven awards were given in the category of poetry, rhymes, novels-fairytale, translation-travelogue, Bangabandhu, Liberation War and other biographies, health-science-technology, drama and book ornamentation etc. 15 thousand Bangladeshi taka, crest and awards are given as awards.

Awards

By year

1418 (2011)
 Rashed Rauf, Category: Poetry, Rhymes, and song
 Khaled Hossain, Category: Poetry, Rhymes, and song
 Mohit Kamal, Category: Story, Novel, and fairy-tale
 Kazi Keya, Category: Bangabandhu, Liberation war
 Tapan Chakrabarty, Category: Health, Science, Technology
 Nashim Ahmed, Category: Book Artist

1419 (2012)
 Hasnath Amzad, Category: Poetry, Rhymes and song
 Dontossow Rowshan, Category: Story, Novel, and fairy-tale
 Hanif Khan, Category: Drama
 Moniruzzaman Palash, Category: Book Artist
 Sheikh Anowar, Category: Health, Science, Technology

1420 (2013)
 Akhtar Hossain, Category: Poetry, Rhymes and song
 Dipu Mahmud, Category: Story, Novel, and fairytale
 Faruk Hossain, Category: Translation and travel story
 Sohel Amin Babu, Category: Bangabandhu and Liberation war
 A S M Babor Ali, Category: Drama
 Biplob Chakrabarty, Category: Book artist

1421 (2014)
 Romen Raihan
 Imtiar Shamim
 Tapan Bagchi
 Munsur Aziz
 Momin Uddin Khaled

1422 (2015) 
 Imdadul Haq Milan
 Mahfuzur Rahman
 Palash Mahbub
 Rita Bhowmic
 Ali Ashgar
 Hasan Khurshid Rumi
 Ashique Mustafa
 Sabbyasaci Mishtri

1423 (2016) 
 Abul Momen
 Moshiur Rahman
 Moshtak Ahmed
 Maruful Islam
 Ahmad Ullah
 Shyamoli Nasrin Chowdhury
 Mizanur Rahman Kollol
 Jamil Bin Siddique
 Uttam Sen

References

External links
 

Bangladeshi literary awards
Civil awards and decorations of Bangladesh